Ghazial is a town of Mulhal Mughlan which is an administrative subdivision of Chakwal District in the Punjab Province of Pakistan. The population of Ghazial is about 9000 people in 2013.

Location

Ghazial is located in Lundi Patti plain, One Jhelum Chakwal boundary. Ghazial is located at East side of Chakwal City, by South East side from Mulhal Mughlan 05 Km away from Jehlum Road.
 
Around it there are many small villages including Dhoke Rehra, Ratta Mohra, Mehmood Mohra, Moohri, and Potha.

Education 
It is a town of well educated people that contributed in development of Chakwal and Pakistan.

Youth of Ghazial's prefer to join Armed Forces and are interested in Education services. 

Ghazial has a high school for boys, and one Elementary School for girls.
The youth of this village has made a welfare wing named as Ghazial Welfare youth wing.

References

Populated places in Chakwal District